David Rogers Windham (born March 14, 1961) is a former American football linebacker in the National Football League for the Washington Redskins.  He played college football at Jackson State University and was drafted in the ninth round of the 1984 NFL Draft by the New England Patriots.

Early life
Windham was born in Mobile, Alabama and attended C.F. Vigor High School in Prichard, Alabama.  He then attended and played college football at Jackson State University.

Professional career
Windham was drafted in the ninth round of the 1984 NFL Draft by the New England Patriots, but never played for the team.  He was signed in 1987 by the Washington Redskins.  The 1987 season began with a 24-day players' strike, reducing the 16-game season to 15.  The games for weeks 4–6 were won with all replacement players, including Windham. The Redskins have the distinction of being the only team with no players crossing the picket line.  Those three victories are often credited with getting the team into the playoffs and the basis for the 2000 movie The Replacements.

References

External links
 

1961 births
Living people
Sportspeople from Mobile, Alabama
American football linebackers
Jackson State Tigers football players
Washington Redskins players
Players of American football from Alabama
National Football League replacement players